Ebrahim Rasool (born 15 July 1962) is a South African politician and diplomat who served as the South African Ambassador to the United States from 2010 to 2015, as a Member of the National Assembly from 2009 to 2010, and as the 5th Premier of the Western Cape from 2004 to 2008. He is a member of the African National Congress and has held various leadership positions in the party.

Early life and education
Ebrahim Rasool was born 15 July 1962 in District Six, Cape Town. When he was nine years old, he and his family were forcefully evicted from the area due to the apartheid government declaring the area a "Whites – only" residential suburb. His family relocated to Primose Park near Manenberg on the Cape Flats.

Rasool matriculated from Livingstone High School in Claremont in 1980. He proceeded to study at the University of Cape Town and graduated with a Bachelor of Arts degree in 1983, and a Higher Diploma in Education in 1984 from the university. During this period, he became involved in student politics. He was employed as a teacher at Spine Road High School in 1985.

Political career
He soon became involved in the anti-apartheid movement. He held senior positions in the United Democratic Front and the African National Congress. He served prison sentences and was also frequently placed under house arrest. Between 1991 and 1994, he was an assistant to the Rector of the University of the Western Cape and the Treasurer of the ANC's provincial structure.

Rasool was elected to the Western Cape Provincial Legislature in April 1994 following the country's first democratic election. He served as the MEC for Health and Social Services from 1994 to 1998. In 1998, he was elected Provincial Chairperson of the ANC. He was appointed as the MEC for Finance and Economic Development in 2001 and held this position until his appointment as the 5th Premier of the Western Cape in April 2004. Mcebisi Skwatsha succeeded him as Provincial Chairperson.

On 14 July 2008, Rasool was recalled from the position of premier by the National Executive Committee of the ANC, as the ANC leadership had disapproved of him giving preference to the large Muslim and Cape Coloured populations in the Western Cape. The MEC for Economic Development and Tourism Lynne Brown was designated as his successor.

Rasool then briefly worked as a special advisor to the President of South Africa, Thabo Mbeki, prior to him being elected a Member of the National Assembly in April 2009. President Jacob Zuma appointed him as South Africa's Ambassador to the United States in July 2010. He returned to South Africa in February 2015.

In April 2018, the ANC National Head of Elections, Fikile Mbalula, announced Rasool as the party's Provincial Elections Head for the 2019 general elections. This move was seen as part of a campaign to have him return as Provincial Chairperson of the ANC. Following the elections, the ANC's support declined even further in the province. Rasool was elected as a Member of the Western Cape Provincial Parliament, but tendered his resignation to the incoming Speaker.

Controversy
Following the arrest of gang leader Quinton Marinus, or "Mr Big", Rasool and the then Western Cape Provincial Minister of Community Safety, Leonard Ramatlakane, started receiving death threats allegedly from the Chinese Triads. This led Ramatlakane to controversially spend R347,716 of public money on security improvements to his home.

In 2010, before taking up his position as ambassador to the United States, an investigation was launched into allegations that Rasool was paying a political reporter in a mainstream newspaper to write articles that portrayed him favourably. The investigation stalled due to material witnesses refusing to cooperate with the investigation.

Personal life
Rasool is married to Rosieda Shabodien. They have two children together.

Bibliography

References 

South African Muslims
Living people
1962 births
University of Cape Town alumni
Alumni of Livingstone High School
Premiers of the Western Cape
African National Congress politicians
Ambassadors of South Africa to the United States
South African people of Malay descent